The women's shot put event  at the 1998 European Athletics Indoor Championships was held on 28 February 1998.

Results

References

External links
Final results

Shot put at the European Athletics Indoor Championships
Shot
1998 in women's athletics